Eupithecia chrodna is a moth in the family Geometridae first described by Herbert Druce in 1893. It is found in Mexico.

The forewings and hindwings are pale greyish brown, each crossed by fine darker brown lines.

References

Moths described in 1893
chrodna
Moths of Central America